Geoplanini is a tribe of land planarians in the subfamily Geoplaninae.

Description
The tribe Geoplanini includes all genera of Geoplaninae that occur east of the Andes plus the Chilean genus Transandiplana. However, there are no currently known synapomorphies uniting these genera, and this group is supported solely on the basis of molecular analyses.

Genera
The tribe Geoplanini contains 26 genera:

Amaga 
Anophthalmoplana 
Barreirana 
Bogga 
Cephaloflexa 
Choeradoplana
Cratera 
Difroehlichia 
Geobia 
Geoplana 
Gigantea 
Imbira 
Issoca 
Liana 
Luteostriata 
Matuxia 
Notogynaphallia 
Obama 
Paraba 
Pasipha 
Piima 
Pseudogeoplana 
Supramontana 
Transandiplana 
Winsoria 
Xerapoa

References

Geoplanidae